Ojala Que Llueva Cafe (English "Hope That It Rains Coffee") is the lead single by the Dominican artist Juan Luis Guerra and his band 4:40 from their fourth studio album of the same title. It was released on 1989 by Karen Records and 1990 in Europe by Ariola Records. The lyrics are a poetic metaphor about the poor conditions of the hard-working people residing in the countryside and the hope that the things are going be better someday in the future. Is one of Guerra’s signature songs and one of the first tracks to gain international attention in his career, peaking on the Billboard Hot Latin Tracks and Latin America airplay charts. The music video was ranked number one of the top 15 best music videos of all time by Dominican artists.

In 1996, the track was covered by the band Cafe Tacuba and included on their album Avalancha de Éxitos. The track was included on Guerra's greatest hits album Grandes Éxitos Juan Luis Guerra y 440 and live versions of the track were included on the albums A Son De Guerra Tour (2013) and Entre Mar y Palmeras (2021). In 2020, the track was re-recorded in an acoustic version and included on his Prive EP.

Track listings and formats 

 Dominican Republic 7" Single
 Ojala Que Llueva Cafe  – 4:07
 Reina Mia – 4:03
 Spain 7" Single (1990)
 Ojalá Que Llueva Café – 4:07
 Razones – 3:59
 Spain CD / Maxi Single (1990)
 Ojalá Que Llueva Café – 4:10
 Estrellitas Y Duendes – 4:23
 Reina Mia – 4:00
 Germany 7" Single (1990)
 Ojalá Que Llueva Café – 4:10
 Reina Mia – 4:00
 France 7" Single (1992)
 Ojalá Que Llueva Café – 4:10
 Estrellitas Y Duendes – 4:23

Charts

References 

1989 singles
1989 songs
Juan Luis Guerra songs
Songs written by Juan Luis Guerra